Tagoe Sisters is the name of a musical duo consisting of twins Lydia Dedei Yawson Nee Tagoe and Elizabeth Korkoi Tagoe. They have been singing in the gospel music industry since 1983. In March 2021, the group was honored by the organizers of 3Music Awards in an event called the 3Music Women's Brunch.

Early life
Lydia Dedei Yawson (née Tagoe) and Elizabeth Korkoi Tagoe, who are twins, were born to the late Hammond Ayikwei Tagoe and Madam Theresa Aidoo on 27 July 1965. Their father, Hammond Ayikwei Tagoe, was from Korle-Wokon, a suburb of Accra and their mother, Theresa Aidoo, was from Dunkwa-on-Offin in the Central Region. They had their education at the Alogboshie primary and middle school, near Achimota in Accra. Later, they went to the YMCA to learn dressmaking, which they abandoned to venture into singing.

Career 
In the early days of their career, the duo worked in a group of three, with Hannah Tsia Mensah, called the "I am Three Sisters". They sang backup for musicians like Felix Bell and G Man and made appearances on Mr Picus Laryea's shows in the 1970s.In 1983, they joined the Open Bible Church International where they met the male singing group the Advent Heralds. They backed the Heralds at their public performances. In 1985 they met the late Rev. Francis Akwasi Amoako who became their mentor. Under his guidance, they toured far and wide both in and out of Ghana and gained fame. Their first album 'Nyame ye Kese' which was written by the Advent Heralds, was released in 1987. Orekyekye and Stay in my Heart followed in 1988. In 1990, they lost their mentor in a fatal accident as they were returning to Accra after performing at a crusade in Takoradi. Rev. Dr Thomas Harry Yawson came into their lives and became their songwriter and director.

Personal lives 
Rev Thomas Yawson married Lydia and they have three children. Elizabeth also has a child. Lydia is a caterer and Elizabeth is an events planner. They established the Tagoe Twin Foundation to support mothers who use their twin children to beg for alms. They also have the Tagoe Sisters Association which was created with the vision to be an enabler for twins' mothers to support each other.

Awards and nominations

References

Ga-Adangbe people
Ghanaian women singers
Ghanaian musical groups